Horní Bojanovice is a municipality and village in Břeclav District in the South Moravian Region of the Czech Republic. It has about 700 inhabitants.

References

Villages in Břeclav District